Pyruclia is a genus of sea snails, marine gastropod mollusks in the family Cancellariidae, the nutmeg snails.

Species
Species within the genus Pyruclia include:
 Pyruclia bulbulus Sowerby, 1832
 Pyruclia pyrum A. Adams & Reeve, 1850
 Pyruclia solida G.B. Sowerby I, 1832

References

 Petit, R.E. & Harasewych, M.G. (2005) Catalogue of the superfamily Cancellarioidea Forbes and Hanley, 1851 (Gastropoda: Prosobranchia)- 2nd edition. Zootaxa, 1102, 3-161. NIZT 682
 Hemmen J. (2007) Recent Cancellariidae. Annotated and illustrated catalogue of Recent Cancellariidae. Privately published, Wiesbaden. 428 pp. [With amendments and corrections taken from Petit R.E. (2012) A critique of, and errata for, Recent Cancellariidae by Jens Hemmen, 2007. Conchologia Ingrata 9: 1-8. https://web.archive.org/web/20120831144310/http://conchologia.com/publication_pdf/13.pdf]

Cancellariidae